Troy Public Radio is a network of public radio stations based in Troy, Alabama, United States, that serve southeastern Alabama and parts of western Georgia and northwestern Florida with classical music, folk music, and jazz programs, as well as news and feature programs from the National Public Radio, Public Radio Exchange, and American Public Media networks. The stations are licensed to Troy University, on whose main campus the studios are located.

History
WTSU-FM started broadcasting on March 1, 1977 as the state's third public radio station (the callsign stands for the university's name then, "Troy State University,"), and the first south of Birmingham.  WTSU originally broadcast at 90.1 MHz with a power of 50,000 watts; by 1981, it moved to its present frequency of 89.9, doubling its wattage to 100,000.  Programming from the start was a blend of NPR news and classical music, combined with an automated block of "beautiful music" between 9:00 a.m. and 4:00 p.m. TUPR discontinued the easy-listening daytime format in 1993 in favor of then-more conventional classical programming.

The station would expand its service area to all of southeastern Alabama in the 1980s, adding the frequencies in Columbus in 1984 and Dothan in 1986. On January 1, 2000, TUPR began broadcasting 24 hours per day.

Public Radio is one component of Troy University's Broadcast and Digital Network; the other is "TrojanVision", a student-operated television channel seen on several cable systems throughout southeastern Alabama. The Broadcast and Digital Network enlist students from the Hall School of Journalism as staffers.

TUPR set a tentative date of May 2010 to begin streaming all three HD channels.  HD-2 consists of the all-music Classical 24 network, while HD-3 airs news programs from the BBC World Service.

In 2011, TUPR began streaming all three of its channels live on the Internet.  It had been one of the few NPR members not to offer live streaming.

Network
Three stations comprise the network:

Notes:

Weekday hosts
Ann Kenda--Morning Edition
Carolyn Hutchinson--In Focus
Joey Hudson--All Things Considered

References

External links
Troy Public Radio

NPR member networks
Classical music radio stations in the United States
Radio stations established in 1977
1977 establishments in Alabama